Tage Danielsson  (5 February 1928 – 13 October 1985) was a Swedish author, actor, comedian, poet and film director. He is best known for his collaboration with Hans Alfredson in the comedy duo Hasse & Tage.

Career
After graduation from Katedralskolan in Linköping, Danielsson matriculated at the University of Uppsala in 1949. There he got involved in student theatre of Östgöta Nation and became a member of the Juvenalorden, as well as serving as vice president of the Uppsala Student Union.

After graduation, Tage Danielsson found work at Sveriges Radio in 1955. From 1959 to 1962 he was the manager for its entertainment department. At his work he came in contact with Hans Alfredson. They started the entertainment production company AB Svenska Ord (Swedish Words Ltd) together in 1961.

In 1972 at the 8th Guldbagge Awards he won the Best Director award for the film The Apple War. At the 12th Guldbagge Awards his film Release the Prisoners to Spring won the award for Best Film. At the 14th Guldbagge Awards his film The Adventures of Picasso won the award for Best Film.

Svenska Ord in general, and Danielsson in particular, excelled in making scorching comments on current events in an illusorily naive and outward-lookingly friendly way that often succeeded to endear even political opponents to his particular brand of humorist humanism. He was also a constant campaigner behind the scene for causes ranging from Anti-Apartheid to Anti-Nuclear to social solidarity, he was also a regular contributor to the anarcho-syndicalist newspaper Arbetaren.

In 1980 he received an honorary doctorate at Linköping University. His death in 1985 was from skin cancer (Malignant melanoma). A statue of him can be seen just outside the grounds of his old school. In 1985 his 1984 film Ronia, the Robber's Daughter, based on Astrid Lindgren's 1981 book Ronia the Robber's Daughter, was entered into the 35th Berlin International Film Festival.

Selected filmography

Film
 Swedish Portraits (Svenska bilder) (1964) – Cousin Nr 1
 Docking the Boat (Att angöra en brygga) (1965) – Olsson
 Stimulantia (1967) – (Segment)
 Skrållan, Ruskprick och Knorrhane (1967) – Knorrhane
 Lådan (1968)
 Out of an Old Man's Head (I huvet på en gammal gubbe) (1968) – Bilförare (uncredited)
 The Apple War (Äppelkriget) (1971) – Bernhard Lindberg
 The Man Who Quit Smoking (Mannen som slutade röka) (1972)
 Egg! Egg! A Hardboiled Story (1975) – Head Waiter
 Release the Prisoners to Spring (Släpp fångarne loss, det är vår!) (1975) – Hennes vän
 The Adventures of Picasso (Picassos äventyr) (1978)
 SOPOR (1981)
 P & B (1983) – Drunkard
 Ronia, the Robber's Daughter (Ronja Rövardotter) (1984)
 False as Water (1985) – Party Guest (uncredited) (final film role)

Television
 Gröna hund (1962, TV Movie)
 Gula hund (1966, TV Movie)
 Spader, Madame! (1969, TV Movie) – Gabriel von Löwensköld
 Glaset i örat (1974, TV Movie)
 Svea hund på Göta Lejon (1976, TV Movie)

References

External links
 
 

1928 births
1985 deaths
Litteris et Artibus recipients
People from Linköping
Swedish entertainers
Swedish-language writers
Swedish film directors
Uppsala University alumni
Sommar (radio program) hosts
Deaths from melanoma
Deaths from cancer in Sweden
Swedish comedians
Swedish atheists
Best Director Guldbagge Award winners
20th-century Swedish male actors
20th-century Swedish comedians